Trifluoroacetonitrile is a nitrile with the chemical formula CF3CN.

Production 
Trifluoroacetonitrile can be produced by dehydration of trifluoroacetamide with trifluoroacetic anhydride in pyridine or carbon tetrachloride. This synthesis route was first described by Frédéric Swarts in 1922.

Trifluoroacetonitrile can also be produced by reacting 1,1,1-trichloro-2,2,2-trifluoroethane and ammonia at 610 °C.

Properties
Trifluoroacetonitrile is a colourless gas that is insoluble in water. Solid trifluoroacetonitrile's crystal structure is orthorhombic.

Uses
Trifluoroacetonitrile can be used to prepare other chemicals such as 3-(trifluoromethyl)isoquinoline and 2,4-bis(trifluoromethyl)pyrimidine.

References

Trifluoromethyl compounds
Nitriles
Organic compounds with 2 carbon atoms